SQ2397 is an element of RNA that was identified by RNA deep sequencing of Clostridioides difficile 630 where it is located immediately upstream of an uncharacterized HTH-type transcriptional regulator.

Homologs are found widely across Bacillota, consistently located 5’ of transcriptional regulators of similar size and sequence, which strongly supports a cis-regulatory function.

This RNA is referred to as CD630_SQ2397.

The sequence is highly conserved and shows no evidence for covariation as per R-scape analysis. The proposed secondary structure is therefore purely hypothetical.

References

External links
 

Cis-regulatory RNA elements